Mazacotte is a surname. Notable people with the surname include:
Alfredo Mazacotte (born 1987), Paraguayan footballer
Ricardo Mazacotte (born 1985), Argentine-Paraguayan footballer